Dawn Thandeka King (born October 1, 1977) is a multi-award winning South African actress, musician, motivational speaker & Social Media Influencer from Eshowe, KwaZulu-Natal.Dawn Thandeka King is best known for her former role as "MaNgcobo" on the most watched and award winning South African soapera Uzalo. King portrayed the role of "MaNgcobo" for almost 7 years. She is coming back to Uzalo on Season 9.

Early life
Dawn Thandeka King was born in Eshowe, KwaZulu-Natal. After finishing her matric, she went on to complete her drama studies at Technikon Natal (now known as DUT).

Personal life
Dawn is a mother of five children. She was married to Durban-based businessman Jabulani Msomi for 15 years until their marriage ended on 2017.

Career
Before Dawn's breakthrough in the acting industry, she was working a 9-5 job in the tourism industry around Durban. She eventually quit her job in the tourism industry to pursue her acting career and her debut in the acting industry came in 2012 where she got a role in Mzansi Magic's telenovela Inkaba. A few years later she portrayed the role of Lindiwe Xulu (Mangcobo) on a telenovela broadcast on SABC1 called Uzalo which is the most viewed television show in South Africa from 2015-2021. Her character was well received by the audience with Dawn receiving praise for her acting skills. She starred in the telenovela Lockdown on Mzansi Magic where she was known as Mazet.She is also seen in Mzansi Bioskop short Zulu drama's persuading her dream career.

In 2021, after she left Uzalo she joined a new telenova called DiepCity to play a leading role. Dawn is returning to Uzalo in March 2023, to play her role

Accolades
She won a SAFTA for Best Actress in a lead role in a TV Drama (Lockdown) 
 She was nominated as Favourite Actress at 2020 Dstv Mzansi Viewers Choice Awards.
 She won KZN Entertainment Awards in Best Actress category  2020.

References

External links

1977 births
Living people
South African film actresses
People from uMlalazi Local Municipality